New York City's 46th City Council district is one of 51 districts in the New York City Council. It has been represented by Democrat Mercedes Narcisse since 2022. She succeeds Alan Maisel, who could not run again in 2021 due to term limits.

Geography
District 46 covers a series of neighborhoods in southeastern Brooklyn along Jamaica Bay, including Canarsie, Bergen Beach, Mill Basin, Gerritsen Beach, Georgetown, and parts of Marine Park, Flatlands, and Sheepshead Bay. Marine Park – the park, not the neighborhood – is also located within the district, as is Floyd Bennett Field.

The district overlaps with Brooklyn Community Boards 15 and 18, and with New York's 8th and 9th congressional districts. It also overlaps with the 19th, 21st, and 22nd districts of the New York State Senate, and with the 41st, 58th, 59th, and 60th districts of the New York State Assembly.

Recent election results

2021
In 2019, voters in New York City approved Ballot Question 1, which implemented ranked-choice voting in all local elections. Under the new system, voters have the option to rank up to five candidates for every local office. Voters whose first-choice candidates fare poorly will have their votes redistributed to other candidates in their ranking until one candidate surpasses the 50 percent threshold. If one candidate surpasses 50 percent in first-choice votes, then ranked-choice tabulations will not occur.

2017

2013

References

New York City Council districts